Bodies in a Bookshop is a 1946 mystery detective novel by the British author Ruthven Todd, written under the pen name of R.T. Campbell. It was one of several novels featuring the botanist and amateur detective Professor John Stubbs.

Synopsis
In a bookshop in a bohemian quarter just off the Tottenham Court Road a colleague of Stubbs encounters two dead men in a backroom. Investigating along with Chief Inspector Bishop of Scotland Yard, Stubbs uncovers a world of blackmail and pornographic books.

References

Bibliography
 Hanson, Gillian Mary. City and Shore: The Function of Setting in the British Mystery. McFarland, 2015.
 Main, Peter. A Fervent Mind: The Life of Ruthven Todd. Lomax Press, 2018.
 Royle, Trevor. The Macmillan Companion to Scottish Literature. Macmillan, 1983.

1946 British novels
British mystery novels
British crime novels
British thriller novels
Novels by Ruthven Todd
Novels set in London
British detective novels